MKS Muszynianka is a Polish women's volleyball club based in Muszyna and playing in the Orlen Liga.

Previous names
Due to sponsorship, the club have competed under the following names:
 Poprad Muszyna (1982–1985)
 Międzyszkolny Klub Sportowy (MKS) Kurier Muszyna (1985–2000)
 MKS Muszynianka Muszyna (2000–2005)
 MKS Muszynianka-Fakro Muszyna (2005–2009)
 Bank BPS Muszynianka Fakro Muszyna (2009–2013)
 Polski Cukier Muszynianka Fakro Bank BPS (2013–2014)
 Polski Cukier Muszynianka (2014–present)

History
The club was founded in 1982 as the volleyball department of Ludowego Zespołu Sportowego Poprad and started competing in the lower divisions of Poland. After few seasons, financial problems forced the club to withdraw from the competition. By achieving promotions the team begun to climb the national leagues, in 2000 it was renamed  and in 2003 it gained promotion to the highest league (called Liga Serie A).

In 2005–06, its third season in the top level, the club won the championship. Another three titles were added (two championships and one super cup) before a remarkable season with the club winning the double (league and cup) in 2010–11 and a few months later it won the super cup of 2011. International success also came when the club claimed the 2012–13 CEV Cup.

Honours

National competitions
  Polish Championship: 4
2005–06, 2007–08, 2008–09, 2010–11

  Polish Cup: 1
2010–11

  Polish Super Cup: 2
2009, 2011

International competitions
  CEV Cup: 1
2012–13

Team
Season 2016–2017, as of February 2017.

References

External links

 Official website 

Volleyball clubs established in 1982
1982 establishments in Poland
Women's volleyball teams in Poland
Sport in Lesser Poland Voivodeship
Nowy Sącz County